Bakir Farrakhovich Farkhutdinov (15 May 1925 – 2008) was a Russian bantamweight weightlifter who was active in the 1950s–60s. In 1954 he won the Soviet, European and world titles.

Farkhutdinov took up weightlifting aged 24, while serving in the Soviet Army, and retired at 41. After that for about 30 years he worked as a masseur with the Moscow football clubs Spartak and Dynamo. He had a son and a daughter.

References

1925 births
2008 deaths
Soviet male weightlifters
European Weightlifting Championships medalists
World Weightlifting Championships medalists